Semiardistomis is a genus of beetles in the family Carabidae, containing the following species:

 Semiardistomis cordicollis (Putzeys, 1846)
 Semiardistomis cyaneolimbatus (Chevrolat, 1863)
 Semiardistomis darlingtoni (Kult, 1950)
 Semiardistomis deletus (Putzeys, 1846)
 Semiardistomis exspectatus Valdés, 2012
 Semiardistomis flavipes (Dejean, 1831)
 Semiardistomis jedlickai (Kult, 1950)
 Semiardistomis labialis (Chaudoir, 1837)
 Semiardistomis laevistriatus (Fleutiaux & Sallé, 1889)
 Semiardistomis maindroni (Kult, 1950)
 Semiardistomis major Valdés, 2012
 Semiardistomis pallipes (Dejean, 1831)
 Semiardistomis pilosellus (Kult, 1950)
 Semiardistomis propinquus (Putzeys, 1866)
 Semiardistomis puncticollis (Dejean, 1831)
 Semiardistomis rugosus (Putzeys, 1866)
 Semiardistomis semipunctatus (Dejean, 1831)
 Semiardistomis subglabra (van Emden, 1949)
 Semiardistomis viridis (Say, 1823)

References

Scaritinae